Hare Green is a hamlet on Harwich Road, in the Tendring district, in the English county of Essex. In 2018 it had an estimated population of 707.

Transport 
For Transport there is the A120 road and the A133 road nearly on the hamlet, but there is no access to either road.

Location grid

References 

Hamlets in Essex
Tendring